The 32nd Chicago Film Critics Association Awards were announced on December 14, 2019. The awards honor the best in film for 2019. The nominations were announced on December 12, 2019. Once Upon a Time in Hollywood received the most nominations (9), followed by The Irishman (8).

Winners and nominees
The winners and nominees for the 32nd Chicago Film Critics Association Awards are as follows:

Awards

Awards breakdown

The following films received multiple nominations:

The following films received multiple wins:

References

External links
 

 2019
2019 film awards